is a Japanese idol. She is a former member of Dempagumi.inc and be nicknamed . Her catchphrase at Dempagumi.inc is "the golden heresy who runs in the universe", and her colour in charge is purple.

Personal life 
In 2017, she came out as bisexual.

Filmography

Variety

TV dramas

Radio

Internet

Films

Advertisements

Image modelling

Music videos

Bibliography

Photo albums

Electronic photo albums

Interviews

Magazines

References

Notes

Sources

External links
 – Ameba Blog 
 
 
 
 
 
 
 

Japanese female models
Japanese idols
Japanese gravure models
Japanese actresses
LGBT models
Musicians from Tokyo
Living people
1989 births
Dempagumi.inc members
Bisexual singers
Japanese LGBT singers